Guy Ben-Ari (born 1984 in Tel Aviv, Israel) is an Israeli painter living and working in New York City.

Biography 
Ben-Ari received his MFA from Columbia University's School of the Arts in 2011, and his BFA with honors from Bezalel Academy of Art and Design in Jerusalem in 2009, where he received the Presser Award for Excellence in Painting. In 2008, Ben-Ari was selected for the Exchange Program for Merit Students to study Painting at the Slade School of Fine Art, UCL, London.

Ben-Ari's body of work focuses on the connection between Psychoanalytic theory, Semiotics and the medium of painting. Following the Psychoanalyst Jacques Lacan’s notion that 'The word kills the thing' by fixing its meaning, he uses an illustrative approach to examine the way metaphors, when taken literally, become dysfunctional. Ben-Ari is interested in the implications of using painting, a medium that rejects literal interpretation, to analyze concepts that reject visual interpretation. Ben-Ari's recent work uses painting as a framework to study elements of post-structuralism and psychoanalytic theory. Much of his work originates in jokes or illustrations of related concepts and situations, as he attempts to employ a literal strategy in an image, without collapsing into a mere illustration.

Since 2009, Ben-Ari runs an arts cultural group with artist Leah Wolf called Meta Meta Meta, to help support the arts in their community in Brooklyn.

Ben-Ari was an artist-in-residence at the Lower East Side Printshop, Triangle Arts in Brooklyn, New York and was a SIP Award recipient from the Robert Blackburn Printmaking Workshop Program at The Elizabeth Foundation for the Arts. Ben-Ari also worked as an Artist-in-Residence at the Lower Manhattan Cultural Council Workspace Residency and at the NARS Foundation, New York.

References

External links
 Guy Ben-Ari's official website 
 Guy Ben-Ari at The Lower Manhattan Cultural Council

Jewish artists
Columbia University School of the Arts alumni
1984 births
Living people
Bezalel Academy of Arts and Design alumni
Artists from New York City